Pune Monorail was a proposed monorail system for the city of Pune.

Background
The Pune Municipal Corporation decided to construct a monorail system to reduce the number of private vehicles along the route. The monorail will be taken up by the Pune Municipal Corporation.

Network
There are 2 lines proposed to be built:

Ring Road line
The first monorail line will run along the proposed High Capacity Mass Transit Route (HCMTR) project. Length of this corridor will be 30 km

Warje-Kharadi line
Warje to Kharadi, 22 km long route.

References

See also
 Pune Metro
 Pune.
 Pune District.
 Lohegaon Airfield.
 Pune Station Bus Stand.
 Pune Railway Station.
 List of roads in Pune.

Proposed monorails in India
Transport in Pune
Planned transport for Pune